March of the Fire Ants EP is an EP by American heavy metal band Mastodon. The album's title track was originally released on the band's debut, Remission (2002).

Track listing

Other appearances
"March of the Fire Ants" appeared on the MTV2 Headbangers Ball compilation and a split 7-inch with High on Fire. The cover of Thin Lizzy's "Emerald" was released on the deluxe edition of Remission and a split 7-inch with American Heritage. "Crusher Destroyer" was featured in the skateboarding game Tony Hawk's Underground. The live version of "Where Strides the Behemoth" was recorded during the Relapse Records Contamination Festival on January 18, 2003 at the Trocadero Theatre in Philadelphia.

Personnel
 Troy Sanders – bass, vocals
 Brann Dailor – drums
 Bill Kelliher – guitar
 Brent Hinds – guitar, vocals

References

Mastodon (band) albums
Mastodon (band) songs
Relapse Records EPs
2003 debut EPs